Fulk FitzRoy was an illegitimate son of Henry I of England. He was perhaps the son of Ansfride, one of Henry's mistresses. He maybe was a monk at Abingdon Abbey. Little is known about him.

Citations

References
 

11th-century English people
12th-century English people
Illegitimate children of Henry I of England
English Christian monks
Sons of kings